Glenea centroguttata is a species of beetle in the family Cerambycidae. It was described by Léon Fairmaire in 1897. It is known from Taiwan, China and Japan.

References

centroguttata
Beetles described in 1897